The State Farm Center is a large dome-shaped 15,544-seat indoor arena located in Champaign, Illinois, owned and operated by the University of Illinois Urbana-Champaign. The arena hosts games for the Illinois Fighting Illini men's basketball, women's basketball, and wrestling teams. It also doubles as a performance and event center, and is one of the largest venues between Chicago and St. Louis. It opened in 1963 and was known until 2013 as Assembly Hall until State Farm Insurance acquired naming rights as part of a major renovation project.

Size
The third largest Illinois arena after the United Center in Chicago and the Allstate Arena in Rosemont, State Farm Center has 15,544 permanent seats but, when portable chairs are placed on the floor for an in-the-round performance, there is a potential for an additional 1,000 depending on the stage configuration.

Opening

State Farm Center opened as Assembly Hall on March 2, 1963, and continues to attract attention for its design and construction. From 1963 to 1965 Assembly Hall was the largest dome structure in North America until the opening of the Astrodome in Houston, Texas. The architect was Max Abramovitz, a University of Illinois alumnus. The contractor was Felmley-Dickerson Co of Urbana, led by Ray Dickerson, who built a number of buildings for the university.

Main uses

Fighting Illini basketball

State Farm Center hosts home games of Illinois Fighting Illini men's basketball and Illinois Fighting Illini women's basketball and is also home to the student cheering section, the "Orange Krush," which occupies the floor around the court as well as some seats.

At the annual "Paint the Hall Orange" game, everyone in attendance would wear an orange shirt. In recent years, however, it has become customary for Illini fans to wear orange at all home games and so the official "PTHO" game was discontinued after the 2007–08 season.

In August 2015, prior to the reopening of the newly renovated State Farm Center, the hardwood floor was dedicated and named Lou Henson Court in honor of the Illinois Fighting Illini men's basketball all-time leader in victories Lou Henson.

IHSA

State Farm Center has hosted a variety of Illinois High School Association events. It has been the home of the state individual wrestling tournament since 1967. From 1963 to 1995, State Farm Center played host to the state finals of the boys' basketball tournament. From 1978 to 1991, it also hosted the IHSA girls' basketball tournament. The IHSA announced on June 15, 2020, that the boys' basketball tournament would return after a 25-year absence.

Broadway Series
State Farm Center is also the venue for the annual WCIA 3 Broadway Series, which features popular musicals such as Les Misérables, Miss Saigon, Rent, and Fiddler on the Roof.

Concerts
The largest concerts by attendance thus far are:

"Illinois Renaissance" renovation
In the autumn of 2008, school officials, led by Athletics Director Ron Guenther, conducted a study to decide whether to refurbish the then-named Assembly Hall or build a new basketball arena.  In 2010, the university opted to renovate the existing structure designed by University of Illinois alumnus Max Abramovitz, and selected the architectural firm AECOM to design the renovation. The athletic department sent surveys to I-Fund and season ticket holders to gauge demand for various premium seating options. Architects used this information to create schematic drawings and architectural renderings near the end of 2012, which then Athletics Director Mike Thomas used to aid in fundraising for the project.  The anticipated renovation cost was between $150 and $160 million, and construction would not start before spring of 2014.  As part of the renovations, State Farm Insurance purchased the naming rights to the arena for $60 million over 30 years.

The State Farm Center began renovations after the 2013–14 men's basketball season. Work included adding luxury suites, club/loge seating, new blue seats  included in the renovation. In the luxury suites and club level seats, there will be concessions where alcoholic beverages will allowed to be served as well as a buffet area. The total budget for the renovation was estimated at $169.5 million.

The construction process did cause some conflicts with scheduled sporting events at the beginning of the 2015-16 basketball season. The men's basketball team played the first five games of the 2015 at the Prairie Capital Convention Center in Springfield, while the 2015 Women's basketball team played their first five games at Parkland College.  The renovated arena hosted its first game on December 2, when the Fighting Illini fell to Notre Dame 84–79.

Naming rights
The following corporate sponsor, Fighting Illini benefactors, former Illinois Fighting Illini men's basketball players, and University of Illinois Urbana-Champaign alumni have donated sizeable contributions towards the $169.5 million renovation cost of the State Farm Center.

Historical Fighting Illini home courts
Kenney Gym (1905–1925) located on the campus of the University of Illinois and is named after Harold E. (Hek) Kenney. The arena opened in 1890 and was originally known as the Men's Gym Annex.
Huff Hall (1925–1963) opened in 1925 and was known as Huff Gymnasium until the 1990s. It is named after George Huff, who was the school's athletic director from 1895 to 1935.
Assembly Hall/State Farm Center (1963–present)

Fighting Illini Men's basketball records at State Farm Center (Assembly Hall)

Attendance

High attendance for game: 17,087 (Illinois 64, Michigan 52, 2/12/2015)
Low attendance for game: 3,016 (Illinois 90, North Dakota State 73, 12/8/1975)
High attendance for season: 282,506, 2006-07 (17 games, 16,618 avg.)
Low attendance for season: 72,949, 1973-74 (11 games, 6,632 avg.)
Consecutive sellouts: 60, (12/1/2005 - 3/8/2008)
Most sellouts in a season: 17 (2006–07)

Individual single game
Most points
Overall – 50, Von McDade, Wisconsin-Milwaukee...12/3/1990
Illini player – 46, Andy Kaufmann...12/3/1990
Most field goals
Overall – 19, Rudy Tomjanovich, Michigan...2/22/1969
Illini player – 17, Andy Kaufmann...12/1/1990 & Eddie Johnson...12/8/1979
Most field goal attempts
Overall – 44, Von McDade, Wisconsin-Milwaukee...12/3/1990
Illini player – 34, Nick Weatherspoon...1/27/73
Best field goal accuracy (10 shot minimum)
Overall (Illini player) – 11/11, Derek Harper...2/19/1983
Illini player – 10/10, Ken Norman...12/14/1985
Most three-point goals
Overall – 9, Von McDade, Wisconsin-Milwaukee...12/3/1990
Illini player – 8, Brandon Paul...1/10/2012, Trenton Meacham...11/19/2006, & Dee Brown...3/3/2005
Most three-point field goal attempts
Overall – 22, Von McDade, Wisconsin-Milwaukee...12/3/1990
Illini player – 16, Kevin Turner...1/3/1998
Best three-point field goal accuracy (5 attempts minimum)
Overall (Illini player) – 5/5, Jamar Smith...12/6/2006
Illini player – 5/5, Sean Harrington...11/26/2000
Most free throws
Overall – 17, Wayne Radford, Indiana...3/2/1978
Illini player – 17, Kiwane Garris...3/5/1997
Best free throw accuracy (10 attempts minimum)
Overall – 14/14, C. J. Kupec, Michigan...1/2/1975
Illini player - 13/13, Kendall Gill...2/8/1990
Most rebounds
Overall – 23, Joe Franklin, Wisconsin...12/19/1966
Illini player – 23, Nick Weatherspoon...3/2/1971
Most assists
Illini player – 15, Bruce Douglas...12/14/1985
Most steals
Illini player – 7, Kendall Gill...3,4,1990, Kenny Battle...3/9/1988 & Bruce Douglas...12/8/1986
Most blocks
Illini player – 11, Derek Holcomb...12/8/1978
Most minutes
Illini player – 60, Bruce Douglas...1/28/84

See also
 List of NCAA Division I basketball arenas

References

External links

 Official Site
 Illinois DIA Facility Bio

College basketball venues in the United States
Illinois Fighting Illini men's basketball venues
Illinois Fighting Illini women's basketball venues
Basketball venues in Illinois
Indoor arenas in Illinois
Music venues in Illinois
Wrestling venues in Illinois
Buildings and structures in Champaign, Illinois
Sports venues in Champaign–Urbana, Illinois
Tourist attractions in Champaign County, Illinois
Buildings and structures of the University of Illinois Urbana-Champaign
Harrison & Abramovitz buildings
1963 establishments in Illinois
Sports venues completed in 1963
State Farm